Guiliam or Willem Lesteens (1590–1661), Latinized Gulielmus Lesteenius,  was a printer and publisher in the city of Antwerp, in the Spanish Netherlands.

Life
Lesteens was born in Antwerp on 19 April 1590, the son of Gaspard Lesteens and Catherine Jauwens. In 1612 he married Maria Verdussen, the eldest daughter of his godfather, Hieronymus Verdussen, and set up in business as an independent printer. His shop in the Hoogstraat bore the sign of the Gulden Pelicaen (Golden pelican). His printer's mark was a pelican with spread wings feeding its young; in later versions flanked by horns of plenty.

He shared the privilege of printing decrees on coinage with his brother-in-law, Hieronymus Verdussen the Younger, from 26 June 1625 until Verdussen's death in 1653.

In 1641 he served a term as dean of De Olijftak, a chamber of rhetoric, and in 1642–1644 two terms as dean of the Guild of St Luke. In the 1640s he was also the leading figure in an association of Antwerp printers (sociorum typographum Antverpiensium) that clubbed together to share the costs (and risks) of producing expensive editions.

In 1650 Lesteens' daughter, Claire, married Engelbert Gymnicus. After Lesteens' death in 1661, Gymnicus took over the running of the family business in 1662.

Publications
1617
 Robert Bellarmine, Opclimminghe des gheests tot Godt door de leeder der creatueren, translated by Nicolaus Burenus (available on Google Books)
1618
Fulvio Androzzi, Onderwys oft practycke om dikwils het H. Sacrament des Autaers profytelyck te nutten, translated by Nicolaus Burenus
Martinus Becanus, Verschillen oft verscheijden titels der Calvinisten, translated by Nicolaus Burenus (available on Google Books)
1619
 Ovid, Metamorphosis dat is: die Herscheppinghe oft Veranderinghe, translated by Joannes Florianus – an illustrated Dutch Metamorphoses (available on Google Books)
 Francisco Arias, Van de tegenwoordigheid Gods, translated by Nicolaus Burenus
1620
 Luca Pinelli, De cracht ende Misterie der H. Misse, translated by Nicolaus Burenus
 Robert Bellarmine, De conste om wel te sterven, translated by Jacobus Stratius (available on Google Books)
1622
 Benet Canfield, Den reghel der volmaeckheyt (available on Google Books; 2nd edition 1623 available on Google Books; 3rd edition 1631 available on Google Books)
 Jan Van Coudenberghe, Onse L. Vrovwe der seven vveeen. Met de mirakelen, getyden, ende misse der selver: insgelycks den oorspronck, ende voortganck der broederschap, translated by Jacobus Stratius (available on Google Books)
 Richard Verstegan, Scherp-sinnighe characteren. Oft subtijle beschrijvinghe (available on Google Books)
1626
 Heyman Jacobs, Den cleynen herbarius, ofte Cruydt-boecxken (available on Google Books)
1628
 Joannes Busaeus, Den schadt der meditatien op allen de Evangelien vande Sondaghen ende Heylighe-daghen vanden gheheelen Jaere, translated by Cornelius Thielmans (available on Google Books)
1631
 Pierre Marchant, Expositio litteralis in Regulam S. Francisci – an exposition of the Rule of St Francis
1635
 Gratulatio in inaugurationem ... Gasparis Nemii, episcopi Antverpiensis – a celebration of the consecration of Gaspard Nemius as bishop of Antwerp (available on Google Books)
1636
 Aubert Miraeus, Rerum Belgicarum Chronicon ab Julii Caesaris in Galliam adventu usqve ad vulgarem Christi Annum M.DC.XXXVI (available on Google Books)
1639
 Luis de la Puente, Het leven van P. Balthazar Alvarez religieus der Societeyt Iesu, translated by Ludovicus Jacobus (available on Google Books)
1644
 François-Hyacinthe Choquet, De heylighen ende salighe in Nederlandt van het Oorden der Predick-heeren, translated by Léonard Janssen-Boy – a hagiography of Dominican saints from the Low Countries (available on Google Books)
1651
 Joannes van Heumen, Den sterfelycken Adam, leerende de maniere van saligh te sterven (available on Google Books)
 Simon De Coninck, Ontdeckten leughen-geest van alle af-ghedwaelde leeraers (available on Google Books)
1654
 with Engelbert Gymnicus: Alan of Lille, Alani magni de Insulis, Doctoris Universalis, Opera Moralia, Paraenetica et Polemica, edited by Charles de Visch (available on Internet Archive)
1656
 with Engelbert Gymnicus: Massaeus Potvliet, Soete bemerckinghen op het Synode der Ghereformeerde ghehouden binnen Dordrecht inde Iaren 1618 ende 1619 (available on Google Books)

References

1590 births
1661 deaths
Printers from the Holy Roman Empire
Musicians from Antwerp
Book publishers (people) of the Spanish Netherlands